2024 in sports describes the year's events in world sport.  The main highlight for this year is the 2024 Summer Olympic and Paralympic Games in Paris.

Calendar by month

January

February

March

April

May

June

July

August

September

October

November

December

Air sports

Alpine skiing

American football

National Football League
 February 4: Pro Bowl in TBD
 February 11: Super Bowl LVIII in  Las Vegas
 April 25–27: 2024 NFL Draft in  Detroit
 September 5, 2024 – January 5, 2025: 2024 NFL season

Aquatics

Archery

Association football
12 January—10 February  2023 AFC Asian Cup, in Qatar
14 June—14 July  2024 Copa América, in United States
14 June—14 July  2024 UEFA Euro, in Germany
TBD—TBD  2023 AFCON, in Ivory Coast

Athletics

Badminton

Bandy

Baseball

Major League Baseball
 March 28 – September 29: 2024 Major League Baseball season
 July 16: 2024 Major League Baseball All-Star Game at Globe Life Field in  Arlington, Texas
 TBD: 2024 Major League Baseball draft
 TBD: 2024 World Series

2024 Little League World Series
August 15–25: 2024 Little League World Series at both Little League Volunteer Stadium and Howard J. Lamade Stadium in  South Williamsport

Basketball

National Basketball Association
 October 24, 2023 – April 14: 2023–24 NBA season
 February 18: 2024 NBA All-Star Game at the Gainbridge Fieldhouse in  Indianapolis, Indiana
April 20: 2024 NBA Playoffs
June 27: 2024 NBA draft

National Collegiate Athletic Association
March 19−April 8: 2024 NCAA Division I men's basketball tournament
March 22−April 7: 2024 NCAA Division I women's basketball tournament

Beach handball

Beach soccer

Beach tennis

Beach volleyball

Biathlon

Bobsleigh & skeleton

Boccia

Bowling

Bowls

Boxing

Canoeing

Cheerleading

Chess

Cricket
 ICC Men's T20 World Cup in  United States and  West Indies
 ICC Women's T20 World Cup

Cross-country skiing

Cue sports

Curling

Cycle ball

Cycling – BMX

Cycling – Cross

Cycling – Road

Darts

Dance sport

Disc golf

Dodgeball

Fencing

Field hockey

Figure skating

Floorball

Freestyle skiing

Futsal
2024 FIFA Futsal World Cup

Goalball

Golf

Gymnastics

Handball

Horse racing

United States
May 4: Kentucky Derby in  Churchill Downs
May 18: Preakness Stakes  Pimlico
June 8: Belmont Stakes  Belmont Park
November 1–2: Breeders Cup  Santa Ana Park

Ice climbing

Ice hockey

National Hockey League
October 10 – April 2024: 2023–24 NHL season
February 3: 2024 National Hockey League All-Star Game
April 2024: 2024 NHL Playoffs
June 27–28: 2024 NHL Entry Draft

Indoor soccer

Judo

Karate

Kickboxing

Lacrosse

Luge

Minigolf

Motorsports

Modern pentathlon

Multi-sport events
 26 July–11 August:  2024 Summer Olympics in Paris, France
 28 August–8 September:  2024 Summer Paralympics in Paris, France
 19 January–2 February:  2024 Winter Youth Olympics in Gangwon, South Korea

Netball

Orienteering

Racquetball

Roller skating

Rowing

Rugby

Sailing

Softball

Surfing

Swimming

Tennis

Grand Slam
January 15–28: 2024 Australian Open
May 26 – June 8: 2024 French Open
July 1–14: 2024 Wimbeldon Championships
August 26 – September 8: 2024 US Open

University sports
FISU - FISU World University Championships

 FISU World University Championship Ski Orienteering 
 FISU World University Championship Speed Skating 
 FISU World University Championship Cross Country 
 FISU University World Cup Finswimming 
 FISU World University Championship Sport Climbing 
 FISU University World Cup Floorball 
 FISU University World Cup Handball 
 FISU World University Championship Futsal 
 FISU World University Championship Golf 
 FISU World University Championship Orienteering 
 FISU World University Championship Beach Volleyball 
 FISU World University Championship Triathlon 
 FISU World University Championship Mind Sports 
 FISU World University Championship Canoe Sprint 
 FISU World University Championship Modern Pentathlon 
 FISU University World Cup Combat Sports 
 FISU University World Cup 3x3 Basketball 
 FISU University World Cup Cheerleading 
 FISU World University Championship Squash

Others
 International Day of University Sport (IDUS) 2024 IDUS 2024 20 September 2024

Volleyball

Wrestling

Multi-sport events
 2024 Summer Olympics
 2024 Summer Paralympics
 2024 Winter Youth Olympics

References

 
Sports by year